MSU may refer to:

Science and technology
Microwave sounding unit, in atmospheric science
Mid-stream urine, used in medicine to test for urinary tract infection
Million service units, particularly in IBM mainframe computers
Mobile stroke unit, a specialised ambulance for patients suspected of having had a stroke
MSU Lossless Video Codec, Moscow State University Lossless Video Codec
Monosodium Urate (Cf. Gout)

Universities

India
Maharaja Sayajirao University of Baroda
Manonmaniam Sundaranar University

Russia
Maritime State University
Moscow State University

United States
McNeese State University
Memphis State University, former name of the University of Memphis
Metropolitan State University in Minneapolis and Saint Paul, Minnesota
Metropolitan State University of Denver
Michigan State University in East Lansing, Michigan
Midwestern State University in Wichita Falls, Texas
Minnesota State University, Mankato
Minnesota State University Moorhead
Minot State University
Mississippi State University
Missouri State University
University of Missouri (antiquated)
Montana State University System
Montclair State University
Morehead State University
Morgan State University in Baltimore, Maryland
Mountain State University
Murray State University

Other places
Management and Science University, Malaysia
Moldova State University, Moldova
Mahendra Sanskrit University, Nepal
Mindanao State University, Philippines
Imam Muhammad ibn Saud Islamic University, Saudi Arabia
Mahasarakham University, Thailand
Mimar Sinan Fine Arts University, Turkey
Midlands State University, Zimbabwe

Other
IATA code for Moshoeshoe I International Airport in Maseru, Lesotho
 ISO 639 code for the Musom language
Studite Brethren (Monaci Studiti Ucraini), a religious society of the Ukrainian Greek Catholic Church
McMaster Students Union, in Hamilton, Ontario, Canada
Muslim Student Union, a variation of Muslim Students' Association
Museum of Contemporary Art, Zagreb (Croatian: Muzej suvremene umjetnosti)
Multinational Specialized Unit, a unit of the Italian Carabinieri
Miyazaki Sportsmen United, the former name of Tegevajaro Miyazaki, a Japanese football club